Hitched is a 2005 American drama television film directed by Thomas Carter.

Plot
A brother and sister run a 24-hour drive-through wedding chapel in Las Vegas.

Cast
 Mark-Paul Gosselaar as Michael
 Leslie Bibb as Emily
 Tara Reid as Theresa

References

External links

2005 television films
2005 films
Films set in the Las Vegas Valley
American drama television films
Television pilots not picked up as a series
Films directed by Thomas Carter (director)
2000s American films